The streak-breasted treehunter (Thripadectes rufobrunneus) is a passerine bird in the ovenbird family Furnariidae. It is endemic to the Talamancan montane forests of Costa Rica and western Panama in Central America.

Taxonomy
The streak-breasted treehunter was formally described in 1865 by the American amateur ornithologist George Newbold Lawrence from a specimen collected by Alexander von Frantzius near San José in Costa Rica. Lawrence coined the binomial name Philydor rufobrunneus. The specific epithet rufobrunneus is Modern Latin meaning "brown". The streak-breasted treehunter is now placed in the genus Thripadectes that was introduced in 1862 by Philip Sclater. The species is monotypic: no subspecies are recognised.

Description
It has a black-scaled dark brown crown and rich brown upperparts shading to rufous on the rump and tail. It has an ochre throat and otherwise tawny underparts which are streaked with ochre, especially on the breast. Young birds are paler with more extensive but less distinct breast streaking. The call is a loud zeck. The song is a buzzy chi-wawr, chi-wowr.

Streak-breasted treehunter is easily distinguished from its relatives by its large size, heavy bill and breast streaking.

Distribution and habitat
This large treehunter is found in hills and mountains from 700 m up to 2500 m altitude, rarely to 3000 m, in damp epiphyte-laden forests and adjacent old second growth, especially in shady ravines.

Behaviour
The streak-breasted treehunter builds a wide saucer nest of rootlets in a 60 cm long burrow in a steep bank, and lays two white eggs between February and August.

It forages for large insects, spiders, amphibians and lizards in dense undergrowth and vines, searching through leaf litter, plant debris, bromeliads and other epiphytes for its prey. It is usually seen alone, but sometimes joins mixed-species feeding flocks.

References

Further reading

streak-breasted treehunter
Birds of the Talamancan montane forests
streak-breasted treehunter
streak-breasted treehunter